Kwasi Sibo (born 24 January 1998) is a Ghanaian professional footballer who plays as a midfielder for Spanish club Amorebieta.

Career
Sibo began his career with Ghanaian side Cheetah FC before joining Armenian Premier League side Banants in September 2017. The following year, he signed for Premier League side Watford on a long-term deal. In January 2019, he joined Albanian Superliga side Skënderbeu Korçë on loan until the end of the season. The following season he spent some time training with Udinese before heading to Spain to join Ibiza on a season-long loan deal. On 12 August 2020, it was announced Sibo would remain on loan at the Spanish side for another season. In August 2021, Sibo signed permanently with Betis Deportivo Balompié.

Personal life 
Sibo is the younger brother of fellow Ghanaian footballer Simon Zibo who plays for Esperança de Lagos.

Career statistics

Club

References

External links

Living people
1998 births
People from Upper West Region
Ghanaian footballers
Association football midfielders
Armenian Premier League players
FC Urartu players
Watford F.C. players
Kategoria Superiore players
KF Skënderbeu Korçë players
Primera Federación players
Segunda División B players
UD Ibiza players
Betis Deportivo Balompié footballers
Ghanaian expatriate footballers
Expatriate footballers in Armenia
Expatriate footballers in Albania
Expatriate footballers in Spain
Ghanaian expatriate sportspeople in Armenia
Ghanaian expatriate sportspeople in Albania
Ghanaian expatriate sportspeople in Spain
Cheetah F.C. players
SD Amorebieta footballers